Operation Enduring Freedom – Philippines (OEF-P) or Operation Freedom Eagle was part of Operation Enduring Freedom and the global War on Terror. The Operation targeted the various Jihadist terror groups operating in the country. By 2009, about 600 U.S. military personnel were advising and assisting the Armed Forces of the Philippines (AFP) in the Southern Philippines. In addition, by 2014, the CIA had sent its elite paramilitary officers from their Special Activities Division to hunt down and kill or capture key terrorist leaders. This group had the most success in combating and capturing Al-Qaeda leaders and the leaders of associated groups like Abu Sayyaf.

Background

The 1898 Treaty of Paris ended the Spanish–American War, with Spain ceding the Philippines to the United States. Islam had arrived in the Philippines before the Spanish. Spain had conquered the northern islands, and the southern islands had become the Sultanate of Sulu (which was a Spanish protectorate, but not under direct administration). The Spanish cession included the islands of Mindanao and the Sulu Archipelago, and the ceded territory included the islands of the Sultanate of Sulu located in the Philippine archipelago where slavery and piracy had for centuries been practiced by the Moros. The Spanish had established coastal garrisons but had never controlled the jungle interiors of the islands.

In 1899, U.S. Brigadier General John C. Bates negotiated the Kiram-Bates Treaty for American Sovereignty over the Moro land, which recognized and respected the position of the Sultan and the Sultanate as well as their Muslim traditions, laws, and practices with the Sultan of Sulu. After the U.S. had completed its goal of suppressing the resistance in Luzon in the Spanish–American War, it unilaterally abrogated the Bates Treaty on March 2, 1904, claiming the Sultan had failed to quell Moro resistance and that the treaty was a hindrance to the effective colonial administration of the area. Bates later confessed that the agreement was merely a temporary expedient to buy time until the northern forces were defeated.

Forces
Special Operations Command, Pacific (SOCPAC) troops were the core of Operation Enduring Freedom – Philippines (OEF-P), an operation which supports the Government of the Republic of the Philippines counterterrorism efforts. The AFP and civilian authorities had improved their ability to coordinate and sustain counterterrorism operations. U.S. and Philippine forces had also worked together under the new Security Engagement Board framework – the primary mechanism for consultation and planning
regarding non-traditional security threats – to complete humanitarian and civil assistance projects and improve living conditions in the southern Philippines. As a result of their combined efforts, support for terrorists had waned markedly.

Deployment first began January 2002 and involved more than 1,200 members of SOCPAC, headed by Brig. General Donald C. Wurster. SOCPAC's deployable joint task force HQ, Joint Task Force 510 (JTF 510), directed and carried out the operation.

The mission was to advise the Armed Forces of the Philippines in combating terrorism in the Philippines. 160 U.S. special forces go out on patrol with Filipinos in jungles of Basilan island, an Abu Sayyaf stronghold, in 2002, U.S. military personnel deployed to Cebu to provide support for a six-month exercise. JSOC could undertake psychological operations to confuse or trap al-Qaeda operatives, but it needed approval from the White House for lethal action. Much of the mission (Exercise Balikatan 02–1) took place on the Basilan Island.

Mission
The mission of the Joint Special Operations Task Force in the Philippines (JSOTF-P) was

Combatants

Armed Forces of the Philippines

United States Armed Forces

The United States had provided the Philippine government with advisors, equipment and financial support to counter Abu Sayyaf and Jemaah Islamiyah. In order to provide a legal basis for the presence of U.S. forces despite provisions in the 1987 Philippine constitution specifically banning the presence of foreign troops, Philippine president Gloria Macapagal Arroyo invoked the 1951 Mutual Defense Treaty between the U.S. and the Philippines. In 2013, operations began to wind down, assisting Philippine forces against Muslim rebels in September 2013. Joint Special Operations Task Force - Philippines disbanded in June 2014, ending a successful 12-year mission.

Timeline of American casualties
On 21 February 2002, the largest loss of life for U.S. forces occurred when 10 soldiers (8 from the E company, 160th SOAR and 2 from the 353rd Special Operations Group) were killed after their MH-47 crashed at sea in the Bohol Strait, southern Philippines, whilst scouting Islamic terrorists on Basilan Island.

On 2 October 2002, a bombing at an open-air market outside the gate of Camp Enrile Malagutay in Zamboanga killed a U.S. Special Forces soldier from A Company, 2nd Battalion, 1st SFG.
One Filipino soldier and one civilian were also killed, and 21 people were wounded including one U.S. and two Filipino soldiers.

On 30 June 2004, a U.S. Special Forces soldier from 2nd Battalion, 1st SFG, was killed in a non-hostile incident in Manila.

On 14 October 2005, a U.S. Special Forces soldier from 5th Battalion, 4th Psychological Operations Group, U.S. Army Special Operations Command. was killed in a non-hostile incident in Makati City.

On 15 February 2007, a U.S. Marine from Combat Logistics Regiment 37, 3rd Marine Logistics Group was killed in a non-hostile incident in Jolo.

On 27 October 2007, a U.S. Special Forces soldier from 2nd Battalion, 1st SFG was killed in an accidental drowning incident at Lake Seit in the southern Philippines.

On 29 September 2009, a roadside bomb killed two U.S. Special Forces soldiers from 3rd battalion, 1st SFG and a Philippine Marine on Jolo island. Three other Philippine service members where injured in the blast. It was initially reported that the two U.S. casualties were Seabees.

Abu Sayyaf

The Abu Sayyaf Group (ASG) is deemed a "foreign terrorist organization" by the United States government. Specifically, it is an Islamist separatist group based in and around the southern islands of the Republic of the Philippines, primarily Jolo, Basilan, and Mindanao.

Since inception in the early 1990s, the group has carried out bombings, assassinations, kidnappings, and extortion in their fight for an independent Islamic state in western Mindanao and the Sulu Archipelago, with a claimed overarching goal of creating a Pan-Islamic superstate across the Malay portions of Southeast Asia, spanning, from east to west, the large island of Mindanao, the Sulu Archipelago (Basilan and Jolo islands), the large island of Borneo (Malaysia and Indonesia), the South China Sea, and the Malay Peninsula (Peninsular Malaysia, Thailand and Burma).

The name of the group is Arabic for Father (Abu) of the Sword (Sayyaf).

Jemaah Islamiyah

Jemaah Islamiyah is a militant Islamic terrorist organization dedicated to the establishment of a fundamentalist Islamic theocracy in Southeast Asia, in particular Indonesia, Singapore, Brunei, Malaysia, the south of Thailand and the Philippines.

Jemaah Islamiyah is thought to have killed hundreds of civilians and is suspected of having executed the Bali car bombing on 12 October 2002 in which suicide bombers killed 202 people, mostly Australian tourists, and wounded many in a nightclub. After this attack, the U.S. State Department designated Jemaah Islamiyah as a Foreign Terrorist Organization. Jemaah Islamiyah is also suspected of carrying out the Zamboanga bombings, the Rizal Day Bombings, the 2004 Jakarta embassy bombing and the 2005 Bali terrorist bombing.

Financial links between Jemaah Islamiyah and other terrorist groups, such as Abu Sayyaf and al-Qaeda, have been found to exist. Jemaah Islamiyah means "Islamic Group" and is often abbreviated JI.

Balikatan training exercises

The Balikatan training exercises were a part of OEF – Philippines which are mainly a series of joint training exercises between the Philippines and the United States. These training exercises are mainly taking place in Mindanao, the Spratly Islands, Tarlac, and other parts in the Philippines. The Balikatan training exercises are focused on joint training and counter-terrorist training aimed on strengthening relations between the Philippines, Moro and the United States. The Balikatan training exercises are also aimed on training Filipino forces to fight the Abu Sayyaf and other Jihadist terror groups.

There have been allegations in the Philippine press and elsewhere that visiting forces from the United States appear to have become a permanent fixture in the landscape of Zamboanga City and other parts of Mindanao. Former presidential executive secretary of the Philippines Eduardo Ermita has responded to these allegations by saying, that the U.S. soldiers "... all look alike so it’s as if they never leave," going on to say that they "... are replaced every now and then. They leave, contrary to the critics’ impression that they have not left". These remarks were made in response to statements made by Edgar Araojo, a political science professor at Western Mindanao State University, that the country had surrendered its sovereignty. In specific response, Ermita said, "Our national sovereignty and territorial integrity are intact", going on to point out that the Balikatan exercises had bolstered national and regional security, and to say that terrorists and communist rebels were "common enemies of democracy, therefore there is nothing wrong with cooperation" between the armed forces of the US and the Philippines.

Renewed mission

Following the Battle of Marawi in 2017, United States Secretary of Defense James Mattis declared a new counter terrorism mission to assist in the combat against affiliates of Islamic State of Iraq and the Levant. The United Kingdom and Australia also sent forces to assist the Armed Forces of the Philippines. By August 2018, 250 Americans were involved in operations in the Philippines.

See also

 Military history of the United States
 Military history of the Philippines
 Moro conflict

References and notes

Further reading

External links
Operation Enduring Freedom – Philippines GlobalSecurity.org History of conflict
Joint Special Operations Task Force Philippines News articles
Balikatan

Success in the Shadows: Operation Enduring Freedom–Philippines and the Global War on Terror, 2002–2015 https://www.armyupress.army.mil/Portals/7/combat-studies-institute/csi-books/success-in-the-shadows.pdf

21st-century conflicts
Military history of the Philippines
Enduring Freedom - Philippines
United States military in the Philippines
Counterterrorism in the United States
Terrorism in the Philippines
United States Marine Corps in the 21st century
Enduring Freedom – Philippines